This is a list of 51 members of the European Parliament for Poland in the 2014 to 2019 session, ordered by name.

See 2014 European Parliament election in Poland for further information on these elections in Poland, and 2014 European Parliament election for discussion on likely changes to the Parliamentary Groups.

Current members

Former members

External links 
 www.pe2014.pkw.gov.pl

2014
List
Poland